Jogdhari is a small village in the Birbhum district of West Bengal, India.  It is on the banks of River Brahmani.  It comes under the municipal authority of Nalhati. It is close to the West Bengal-Jharkhand border.

References

Villages in Birbhum district